Rusatai-ye Abuzer (also Romanized as Rūsatāī-ye Ābūẕer) is a village in Kongor Rural District, in the Central District of Kalaleh County, Golestan Province, Iran. At the 2006 census, its population was 450, in 93 families.

References 

Populated places in Kalaleh County